Sojas Rud Rural District is in Sojas Rud District of Khodabandeh County, Zanjan province, Iran. At the National Census of 2006, its population was 15,771 in 3,530 households. There were 15,569 inhabitants in 4,330 households at the following census of 2011. At the most recent census of 2016, the population of the rural district was 14,700 in 4,398 households. The largest of its 33 villages was Chuzak, with 1,787 people.

References 

Khodabandeh County

Rural Districts of Zanjan Province

Populated places in Zanjan Province

Populated places in Khodabandeh County